Glory Hope Mountain is a concept album by Canadian indie folk band The Acorn, released 25 September 2007 on Paper Bag Records. It is their second full-length.

The album was recorded and produced by Jarrett Bartlett.

Several members of Toronto-based indie pop band Ohbijou are credited with playing instruments and additional recording on the album. Singer Casey Mecija provides vocals for the final track.

The album is based on the life of Rolf Klausener’s Honduran-born mother, Gloria Esperanza Montoya, and the title is a rough translation of her name.

The album art was inspired by local Ottawa mixed-media artist Amy Alice Thompson's series "Gloria".

Track listing 
All lyrics were written by Rolf Carlos Klausener. All music was written by The Acorn.

References 

 Globe and Mail feature story
 PopMatters review

The Acorn (band) albums
2007 albums
Paper Bag Records albums